Hugo Friedrich Philipp Johann Freiherr von Freytag-Loringhoven (May 20, 1855 – October 19, 1924) was a Prussian general and a writer on military matters, being awarded the Pour le Mérite in 1916 for his work as a historian.

Biography 
He was born on May 20, 1855 in Copenhagen, Denmark, the son of a diplomat, Karl von Freytag-Loringhoven (1811–1882). His family was Baltic German and originated in Westphalia.

He entered the Imperial German army in 1877, a few years after German unification, as a lieutenant. From 1887 to 1896 he taught military history at the Prussian Military Academy in Berlin. He then worked for a while for Alfred von Schlieffen, later being described as "Schlieffen's favorite disciple", and in 1907 took command of the 12th Regiment of Grenadiers at Frankfurt an der Oder. In 1910 he became Oberquartiermeister, and in December 1913 took command of the 22nd Division at Cassel.

With the mobilisation of troops in 1914 for World War I, he became firstly a liaison officer with the Austro-Hungarian forces. He then returned to the Supreme Army Command as Stellvertretender Generalquartiermeister (Deputy Quartermaster-General), where he became an unofficial adviser to Erich von Falkenhayn although he bemoaned his lack of influence. He briefly led the 9th Reserve Corps, then the 17th Reserve Division, and in September 1916 went back to the Supreme Army Command.  On April 18, 1918 he was promoted to General of the Infantry.

He died on October 19, 1924 in Weimar.

Publications 
His published works include:
 Deductions from the World War the English translation of Folgerungen aus dem Weltkriege (1918)

Family 
His son Leopold married the Dadaist artist and poet Elsa von Freytag-Loringhoven.

See also
 Freytag-Loringhoven

References

Sources

 Antulio Joseph Echevarria, "General Staff Historian Hugo Freiherr von Freytag-Loringhoven and the Dialectics of German Military Thought", The Journal of Military History, no 60, 1996.
 
 Bernd Freiherr Freytag v. Loringhoven, Freytag von Loringhoven: Eine Kurzgefasste Familiengeschichte, Munich, 1986.

1855 births
1924 deaths
German military historians
Generals of Infantry (Prussia)
Recipients of the Pour le Mérite (civil class)
German male non-fiction writers
German Army generals of World War I